Min-hee is a Korean unisex given name. The meaning depends on the hanja used to write each syllable of the name. There are 27 hanja with the reading "min" and 25 hanja with the reading "hee" on the South Korean government's official list of hanja which may be registered for use in given names.
 
People with this name include:
Suk Min-hee (born 1968), South Korean handball player
Kim Min-hee (actress, born 1972), South Korean actress
Jeon Min-hee (born 1975), South Korean fantasy writer
Lee Min-hee (born 1980), South Korean handball player
Kim Min-hee (actress, born 1982), South Korean actress
Bae Min-hee (born 1988), South Korean handball player
Kang Min-hee (born 1991), South Korean singer, member of Miss S

See also
List of Korean given names
Kim Min-hee (disambiguation)

References

Korean unisex given names